Sean Dinesh Weeraratna (born 21 November 1985) is a Scottish cricketer of Sri Lankan origin who was born in Lesotho.

He was born in Lesotho, to parents from Sri Lanka.

Weeraratna is an allrounder who bowls right-arm medium-fast and has represented Scotland in every age level, including the 2004 and 2006 Under-19 World Cups.

He made his first-class debut against Ireland during the 2005 ICC Intercontinental Cup but didn't play again until the 2007 tournament when he lined up against the UAE.

External links
Cricinfo

1985 births
Living people
Scottish cricketers
Sri Lankan cricketers
British Asian cricketers
Scottish people of Sri Lankan descent
Lesotho emigrants to the United Kingdom
Sri Lankan emigrants to the United Kingdom
People from Maseru District